Amidohydrolases (or amidases) are a type of hydrolase that acts upon amide bonds.

They are categorized under EC number EC 3.5.1 and 3.5.2.

Examples include: 
 Beta-lactamase
 Histone deacetylase
 Urease

The amidohydrolase superfamily is a large protein family of  more than 20,000 members with diverse chemistry and physiologic roles.  Due to its complexity and size, the amidohydrolase superfamily is being used by the Enzyme Function Initiative (EFI) for developing a large-scale strategy for functional assignment of unknown proteins.

See also

 

EC 3.5.1
EC 3.5.2
Hydrolases